Benita Asas Manterola (4 March 1873 – 21 April 1968) was a Spanish teacher, journalist, and suffragist.

Biography 
Benita Asas Manterola was born in San Sebastián. She trained as a teacher and worked in the Madrid public school system. Together with Pilar Fernández Selfa, Asas founded the bi-monthly periodical El Pensamiento Femenino, which ran from 1913 to 1917. She was president of the Asociación Nacional de Mujeres Españolas (ANME) from 1924 to 1932. Beginning in 1925, she also directed ANME's monthly newspaper, Mundo Feminino. In 1929, she represented ANME at the Women's International League for Peace and Freedom international congress.  Asas was also a founding member of the Lyceum Club Femenino Español of Madrid, created by Maria de Maeztu Whitney. Asas died in Bilbao in 1968.

Legacy 
In 2017, a street in the city of Bilbao was renamed in recognition of Asas' contribution to the defense of women's rights.

References 

1873 births
1968 deaths
Basque women
People from San Sebastián
Spanish feminists
Basque Anti-Francoists